Bonnie Ora Sherk (née Bonnie Ora Kellner; May 18, 1945 – August 8, 2021) was an American landscape-space artist, performance artist, landscape planner, and educator. She was the founder of The Farm, and A Living Library. Sherk was a professional artist who exhibited her work in museums and galleries around the world. Her work has also been published in art books, journals, and magazines. Her work is considered a pioneering contribution to Eco Art.

Early life 
Bonnie Ora Kellner was born on May 18, 1945, in New Bedford, Massachusetts. She grew up in Montclair, New Jersey. Her father Sydney Kellner was the area director of the American Jewish Committee and lecturer of art and architecture. Her mother was a first grade teacher.

Sherk graduated Douglass College, Rutgers University in the 1960s. She studied under Robert Watts at Rutgers, who taught her about the Fluxus movement. She later enrolled in an MFA program at San Francisco State University.

Career
Sherk moved to San Francisco in the late 1960s with her husband David Sherk.

Sherk is a developer of a systemic, place-based approach to environmental transformation and education which links systems - biological, cultural, technological.  Integrated with such innovations, like Green-Powered Digital Gateways, Sherk's approach incorporates interdisciplinary, standards-based, hands-on learning, community ecological planning and design, and state-of-the-art communications and technologies. Sherk's goal is to integrate local resources: human, ecological, economic, historic, technological, and aesthetic - seen through the lens of time - to make relevant ecological transformations, which are integrated with hands-on learning opportunities and community programs.

In an interview with Peter Cavagnaro, Sherk shares her love and passion for the environment. She believes that the environment is a "beautiful" and "diverse" place and that it is the most practical place for art and to create transformation, because it has the ability to reach communities near and far.

Group exhibitions 

 2014, Vegetation As Political Agent, PAV, Parco Arte Vivente, Turin, Italy
 2017, Venice Biennale, Viva Arte Viva, May 13 - November 16, 2017.
 2019, Territorios que importan. Arte, Género, Ecologia, CDAN, Centro de Arte y Naturaleza, Huesca, Spain.

Works

A Living Library (1980s–2021)

A Living Library was Sherk's ongoing work she started in the 1980s, that consists of transforming environments -buried urban streams and asphalted public spaces, into thriving art gardens. She has transformed these spaces in order to build education centers for children in communities in San Francisco and New York City.

The Farm (1974–1980) 

Created in 1974, and lasting through 1980, by Sherk, The Farm  (also known as Crossroads Community) was a 7 acre eco garden and art space that spreads across traffic meridians and underused spaces under freeway overpasses. It even includes animals. This piece provided internships, educational activities for children, and acted as a public park throughout its duration.

Sherk felt that people lacked a “spiritual and ecological balance within ourselves and larger groups and nations,” and felt that a space like the Farm could offer a solution to this issue through community connection, education, and creating a space within the urban landscape to uncover the natural environment that exists within the landscape and demonstrate our connection to life and the ecosystem.

Living In The Forest
Living In The Forest: Demonstrations of Atkin Logic, Balance, Compromise, Devotion, Etc. was an installation created in 1973 for De Saisset Museum in Santa Clara, conceived as a "a metaphor for life in all of its aspects, including birth, death, struggles for survival, compromise, living our daily lives, etc."

Public Lunch
Public Lunch was one of Sherk's most well-known performance pieces. The piece consisted of Bonnie eating lunch in cages with various animals, such as lions and tigers, at the San Francisco Zoo. She did this on a Saturday at 2pm in 1971, during normal feeding time and prime spectator watching.

Sitting Still Series 
In Bonnie Ora Sherk's Sitting Still Series, 1970 (digital projection, photo documentation of performances) the artist sate for approximately one hour in various locations around San Francisco as a means to subtly change the environment simply by becoming an unexpected part of it. At the first performance, Sherk, dressed in a formal evening gown, sat in an unholstered armchair amidst garbage and creek runoff from the construction of the Army Street freeway interchange. Facing slow moving traffic, her audience was the people driving by. The following month Sherk sat silently in the midst of a flooded city dump at California and Montgomery Streets. Other locations in the series included the Financial District, the Golden Gate Bridge, and the Bank of America plaza.  Sherk also continued her piece at the San Francisco Zoo in a number of indoor and outdoor animal cages. Sitting Still culminated in the performance Public Lunch, in which the artist ceremoniously ate an elaborately catered lunch in an empty cage located next to a cage of lions during public feeding time at the zoo. The project reinforced Sherk's commitment to studying the interrelationship of plants, animals, and humans with the goal of creating sustainable systems for social transformation.  The Sitting Still Series was exhibited in total as part of Public Works: Artists Interventions 1970s - Now, curated by Christian L. Frock and Tanya Zimbardo at Mills College Art Museum, September - December 2016; Sherk's first image from the series graces the cover of the exhibition catalogue designed by John Borruso.

Awards 
In 1970, the first SECA Vernal Equinox Special Award, which recognizes conceptual and experimental projects, was presented to Sherk and Howard Levine by the SFMOMA.

In 2001, Marion Rockefeller Weber's Arts and Healing Network awarded Sherk the 2001 AHN Award "for being an outstanding educator and for using her creativity to foster environmental healing."

Personal
Sherk was married to David Sherk. The couple later divorced.

Sherk died on August 8, 2021 in San Francisco, California. She was buried on August 11 at the Mendocino Jewish Cemetery near the grave of her parents.

References

External links 
 https://alivinglibrary.org/

1945 births
2021 deaths
American women performance artists
American performance artists
American landscape architects
Women landscape architects
California women architects
American women educators
20th-century American women artists
21st-century American women
Artists from San Francisco
Environmental artists